Clinton Jones may refer to:

Clinton Jones (footballer) (born 1984), Australian rules footballer
Clinton Jones (American football) (born 1945), former professional American football player
Clinton Jones (aviator) (1892–1965), World War I flying ace
Clinton Jones (White Collar), a character from the USA Network series White Collar
Clinton Jones, character in The Actress
Clinton "Ton" Jones, presenter  Auction Hunters

See also
Clint Jones (born 1984), American ski jumper